Gmina Słubice may refer to either of the following administrative districts in Poland:
Gmina Słubice, Masovian Voivodeship
Gmina Słubice, Lubusz Voivodeship